The 1982 German Grand Prix was a Formula One motor race held at the Hockenheimring on 8 August 1982. It was won by Patrick Tambay for Scuderia Ferrari.

Report

Qualifying
Hockenheim had been modified from the year before, with the first chicane being made slower and another chicane added to slow cars through the very fast Ostkurve. Didier Pironi set the fastest practice time, but was seriously injured in qualifying for this Grand Prix and never raced in Formula One again. With the track wet thanks to persistent showers, Pironi was on a quick lap when his Ferrari hit the back of Alain Prost's slow moving Renault at high speed, vaulting over the top of it before landing tail-first and cartwheeling to a stop in eerie similarity to Gilles Villeneuve's fatal accident earlier in the season. Pironi survived but suffered severe leg injuries that sidelined him for the rest of the year. He never managed to return to Formula One and died in 1987. Pironi's accident also had a profound effect on Prost who never forgot the sight of the Ferrari flying over his car, the crash firming his views on the danger of driving Formula One cars in the wet, where visibility was virtually zero when following behind another car.

Thanks to Hockenheim's long straights, the turbocharged cars were overwhelmingly dominant in qualifying. Not only did turbocharged cars take up the first six grid positions, but the utmost proof of this was how Riccardo Patrese, who placed 6th in the turbocharged Brabham-BMW, was 2.9 seconds faster than the fastest non-turbo qualifier, Michele Alboreto in 7th driving a Ford-Cosworth powered Tyrrell. The Toleman pair of Derek Warwick and Teo Fabi could not use the turbocharged Hart engines to their advantage, with Warwick only managing 14th position and Fabi failing to qualify.

Race
Since Ferrari never withdrew the injured Pironi, pole position was left empty at the start. Nelson Piquet led the race, but collided with Eliseo Salazar while lapping him at the new Ostkurve chicane. After the two cars came to a stop, an irate Piquet quickly climbed out of his Brabham, approached Salazar, and then punched and kicked Salazar in a rage, which continued for some time after the collision. Several months later a mechanic revealed that Piquet's BMW engine was suffering from mechanical issues and would have blown up anyway had he not been taken out by the crash, so Piquet phoned up Salazar to thank him. Patrick Tambay, driving the lone Ferrari, won his first Formula One race.

Classification

Qualifying

Race

Championship standings after the race

Drivers' Championship standings

Constructors' Championship standings

Note: Only the top five positions are included for both sets of standings.

References

German Grand Prix
German Grand Prix
German Grand Prix
German Grand Prix